Vipawan Siripornpermsak (born 9 May 2000) is a Thai taekwondo practitioner. In 2018, she won one of the bronze medals in the women's 57 kg event at the 2018 Asian Games held in Jakarta, Indonesia.

In 2019, she competed in the women's featherweight event at the 2019 World Taekwondo Championships held in Manchester, United Kingdom where she lost her first match against Fernanda Aguirre of Chile.

References

External links 
 

Living people
2000 births
Place of birth missing (living people)
Vipawan Siripornpermsak
Taekwondo practitioners at the 2018 Asian Games
Medalists at the 2018 Asian Games
Vipawan Siripornpermsak
Asian Games medalists in taekwondo
Vipawan Siripornpermsak
Southeast Asian Games medalists in taekwondo
Competitors at the 2019 Southeast Asian Games
Vipawan Siripornpermsak